Cerocala oppia is a moth of the family Erebidae first described by Herbert Druce in 1900.

Distribution
It is found in Somalia.

References

Endemic fauna of Somalia
Ophiusina
Fauna of Somalia
Moths of Africa
Moths described in 1900